Frederick Alber (June 28, 1838 – September 12, 1913) was a United States soldier who fought for the Union Army as a member of Company A, 17th Michigan Infantry during the American Civil War. He was awarded his nation's highest military honor, the U.S. Medal of Honor, on July 30, 1896 for valor during the Battle of Spotsylvania Court House in 1864.

Formative years
Born in Germany on June 28, 1838, Frederick Alber emigrated to the United States in 1846, and settled in Michigan, where he became a farmer.

Civil War
At the age of 24, Alber enrolled for a three-year term of Civil War military service at Manchester, Michigan on July 2, 1862. He then officially mustered in for duty as a private with Company A of the 17th Michigan Infantry on August 19.

Engaged with the 17th Michigan in the Battle of Spotsylvania Court House in 1864, he captured two enemy soldiers after freeing Lieutenant Charles Todd, one of the officers from his regiment who had been captured by Confederate troops. On February 21, 1865, he was recognized for his valor when Major General John G. Parks, commanding officer of the U.S. Ninth Army Corps, recommended him for the Medal of Honor.

On June 3, 1865, Alber honorably mustered out at Delaney House in Washington, D.C.

Post-war life
Following his honorable discharge from the military, Alber returned to Michigan. Married to Mary S. Alber, he was widowed by her on December 8, 1896.

Death and interment
Alber died in Oregon Township, Michigan at the age of 75 on September 12, 1913, and was buried at that township's cemetery in Lapeer County.

Medal of Honor citation
Rank and organization: Private, Company A, 17th Michigan Infantry. Place and date: At Spotsylvania, Va., May 12, 1864. Entered service at: Manchester, Mich. Born: 1838, Germany. Date of issue: July 30, 1896.

Citation:

Bravely rescued Lt. Charles H. Todd of his regiment who had been captured by a party of Confederates by shooting down one, knocking over another with the butt of his musket, and taking them both prisoners.

In November 1999, U.S. Senator Spencer Abraham (R-MI) paid tribute to Alber. According to the November 10, 1999 edition of the Congressional Record – Senate, Abraham delivered the following addressed to his colleagues:

See also

List of Medal of Honor recipients
List of American Civil War Medal of Honor recipients: A–F

External links
 McAfee, William B. "Pvt. Frederick Alber Memorial", in Michigan's Messenger: The Newsletter of the Department of Michigan – Sons of Union Veterans of the Civil War, Vol. 8, No. 3, 2000 (retrieved online August 9, 2018). Lansing, Michigan: Sons of Union Veterans of the Civil War, Department of Michigan.

References

1838 births
1913 deaths
Union Army soldiers
United States Army Medal of Honor recipients
People of Michigan in the American Civil War
German emigrants to the United States
Foreign-born Medal of Honor recipients
People from Lapeer County, Michigan
German-born Medal of Honor recipients
American Civil War recipients of the Medal of Honor